Frente a Frente Vol. I is a compilation album released by Juan Gabriel in 1984. The album features some Rocío Dúrcal tracks with others Juan Gabriel songs all from the 1982 album: Cosas de Enamorados.

Track listing

References 

Juan Gabriel compilation albums
1986 compilation albums
Rocío Dúrcal compilation albums